Fenoverine (INN) is an antispasmodic [also known as spasmolytics] drug, which acts by inhibiting calcium channels [much in the same way as traditional calcium channel blockers, which are used as antianginal drugs]. In the case of Fenoverine, the relaxation occurs in abdominal / intestinal smooth muscles, while in case of antianginal drugs, the relaxation occurs in coronary vessels. Notably Fenoverine does not act as an antianginal agent.

Toxicity
Fenoverine is known to cause rhabdomyolysis.

References

Phenothiazines
Carboxamides
Piperazines
Benzodioxoles